The 1935 Mississippi State Maroons football team represented Mississippi State College during the 1935 college football season. It was the first year as head coach for Ralph Sasse, who had previously coached at Army. Sasse led the Maroons to a 13–7 upset win over Army, a game which has been called one of the greatest wins in school history.

Schedule

References

Mississippi State
Mississippi State Bulldogs football seasons
Mississippi State Maroons football